Canton of Grand-Bourg is a former canton in the Arrondissement of Pointe-à-Pitre in the department of Guadeloupe. It covers an area of 55.54 km² and in 2012 it had a population of 5,423. It was disbanded following the French canton reorganisation which came into effect in March 2015. It comprised the commune of Grand-Bourg, which joined the new canton of Marie-Galante in 2015.

See also
Cantons of Guadeloupe
Communes of Guadeloupe
Arrondissements of Guadeloupe

References

Former cantons of Guadeloupe
2015 disestablishments in France
States and territories disestablished in 2015